Standing on the summit of North Hessary Tor in Devon, England is an FM radio and television transmitter which uses as aerial a  high guyed mast.

History
It was built by BICC for the BBC in 1955 when a transmitter was needed to introduce 405 line television into Devon, alongside Rowridge and Pontop Pike (both 500ft). It now carries a small UHF TV transmitter which serves Princetown and Dartmoor. FM radio transmissions began in 1956 and cover most of Devon and eastern parts of Cornwall, along with Somerset and South Wales as a backup for Wenvoe. It is owned and operated by Arqiva.

Services listed by frequency

Analogue radio (FM VHF)

In all BBC publications the national FM ERPs for North Hessary Tor are listed as 160 kW (mixed polarisation): Classic FM list their ERP as 80 kW (horizontal) and 80 kW (vertical) for North Hessary Tor which equates to the same power as the BBC.

The mast covers a large area including Devon, Cornwall, Somerset and South Wales.reaches Ireland's south east especially radio 1 97.7

Digital radio (DAB)

Analogue television

17 December 1954 – 3 January 1985

Until 12 August 2009

Analogue and digital television

12 August 2009 – 9 September 2009

Digital television

9 September 2009 – June 2013

From June 2013
In June 2013, BBC A moved from UHF 62 to UHF 50, to allow for the clearance of the 800 MHz band for 4G LTE mobile services.

See also
List of masts
List of tallest structures in the United Kingdom

References

External links
 The Transmission Gallery: North Hessary Tor Transmitting Station photographs, coverage maps and information
 North Hessary Tor Transmitter at thebigtower.com

Radio masts and towers in Europe
Transmitter sites in England